The Honourable Horton Clement Williams QC (born 21 April 1933) is a retired judge of the Supreme Court of South Australia.

Early life
Williams was born in Sydney and attended Newington College (1947–1950). In 1950 his family moved to South Australia and he enrolled at the University of Adelaide and graduated in law.

Legal career
Williams was a Judge's Associate from 1954 until 1956 and was admitted to the South Australian Bar in 1955. From 1956 until 1977 he was in private practice. He was appointed Queen's Counsel in 1974.

In 1995, he was appointed as the inaugural presiding member of South Australia's Gaming Supervisory Authority, the supervising regulator for the Adelaide Casino and licensed gaming machine premises, effective 1 July 1995. Williams resigned this position on 31 August 1995 to accept appointment as a Justice of the State's Supreme Court. He retired in 2003 and died in 2020.

Other legal positions held included chairman of the Judicial Conference of Australia, vice-president of the Australian Bar Association and president of the South Australian Bar Association .

Community involvement
Williams was Commodore of the Royal South Australian Yacht Squadron from 1991 until 1993.

References

1933 births
Living people
Judges of the Supreme Court of South Australia
People educated at Newington College
Adelaide Law School alumni
Australian King's Counsel
20th-century Australian judges
21st-century Australian judges